George Edmund Gorman (April 13, 1873 – January 13, 1935) was a U.S. Representative from Illinois.

Biography
Born in Chicago, Illinois, Gorman attended the public schools of his native city. He was graduated in law from Georgetown University at Washington, D.C. in 1895. He was admitted to the bar in 1895 and commenced the practice of law in Chicago the following year. He served as assistant prosecuting attorney of Chicago 1897-1900.

Gorman was elected as a Democrat to the Sixty-third Congress (March 4, 1913 – March 3, 1915). He declined to be a candidate for reelection in 1914. He resumed the practice of law in Chicago. He served as assistant State's Attorney 1920-1928. He served as master in chancery of the circuit court from 1930 until his death in Chicago on January 13, 1935. He was interred in Holy Sepulchre Cemetery.

In 1923, Gorman unsuccessfully ran as a Republican nominee for the Superior Court of Cook County.

References

1873 births
1935 deaths
Politicians from Chicago
Georgetown University Law Center alumni
Democratic Party members of the United States House of Representatives from Illinois
Burials at Holy Sepulchre Cemetery (Alsip, Illinois)
Illinois Republicans